The Literature of São Tomé and Príncipe  is the one of the richest in Lusophone Africa. Most works are written in Portuguese, but there are also works in Forro Creole, and notably English as well as Caué Creole. Recently there are very few works written in Príncipense Creole (Lunguye).

History
Works and history literature from the two island were first done by the Portuguese in the 16th century.  Its first recorded literature of the islands was done by Caetano da Costa Alegre, his notable work was the poem collection Visão. Later another writer of the archipelago was Sara Pinto Coelho.

In the 20th century, came more writers from the archipelago including Francisco José Tenreiro who became one of the greatest writers in history and is the most influential writer of the nation. He attended Escola Superior de Administração Colonial (High School of Colonial Administration) in Lisbon. He contributed to the Cape Verdean review Claridade and later did poems and song collections and related to African-American folk songs. Later female writers Manuela Margarido and Alda Espírito Santo wrote books and poems. Some of the writers would be related to nationalism and their struggle for independence from Portugal.

More writers wrote works after independence including Olinda Beja and Conceição Lima and into the 21st century and continues today.

Despite literary improvements in some parts of Africa today, mainly coastal, the archipelago still has literacy rate comparable to nearby poor countries but slightly higher.

Writers

Olinda Beja
Albertino Bragança
Guadalupe de Ceita
Sara Pinto Coelho
Alda Neves da Graça do Espírito Santo
Carlos Graça
Conceição Lima

Poets
Olinda Beja
Caetano da Costa Alegre
Francisco da Costa Alegre
Alda Neves da Graça do Espírito Santo
Conceição Lima
Manuela Margarido
António Lobo de Almada Negreiros
Rafael Branco
Francisco José Tenreiro - historically the most renowned of the islands' writers

Journalists
António Lobo de Almada Negreiros
Aurélio Martins

References

Further reading
 Ryazova, E. A., Portuguese Literature in Africa, 1972